The Junior Eurovision Song Contest 2014 was the 12th edition of the annual Junior Eurovision Song Contest, and took place, for the first time, in Malta. This was the third time that the contest was hosted by the  winning country. Maltese national broadcaster PBS was the host broadcaster for the event. The final took place on 15 November 2014 and was in the Malta Shipbuilding in Marsa, near Valletta. Moira Delia, a Maltese television personality, hosted the show, marking the first time in Junior Eurovision history that there was only one presenter of the show. The interval included a performance by last year's winner Gaia Cauchi and La Voix Academy featuring Andy Shaw and Veronica Rotin.

The winner of the contest was Vincenzo Cantiello, who represented Italy with the song "Tu primo grande amore".  and  finished in second and third place, respectively. This was Italy's first victory in a Eurovision competition since the last edition of Jeux Sans Frontières in 1999, and also marked the first time since the inaugural 2003 contest that a country had won in its débutante year.

Location 

On 18 December 2013, the Maltese national broadcaster Public Broadcasting Services (PBS) and the European Broadcasting Union (EBU) announced that the Junior Eurovision Song Contest 2014 would take place in Malta. Vladislav Yakovlev, the executive supervisor for the Junior Eurovision Song Contest, announced that there would be no host city for the contest, but that the island of Malta would be a host island instead. This was the first time Malta had hosted any of the Eurovision-related events.

On 16 June 2014, the EBU confirmed that the 2014 contest would be held at three large former shipbuilding sheds of Malta Shipbuilding. The middle shed would be the main audience area and stage, while the two side sheds would be used as audience entrances and exits, restrooms, and refreshment stalls. In total, there was capacity for 4,000–4,500 people inside the buildings.

Format

Graphic design
On 9 May 2014, Anton Attard, CEO of the host broadcaster, revealed the Junior Eurovision Song Contest 2014 logo and slogan. The slogan was "#together", while the logo was inspired by the Maltese cross. Each of its coloured segments represented a feature of Malta: Sand, Sea, Stone, Grass, Sky, Dusk and Sunset.  The postcards included a theme of "extreme sports", and were partially filmed at the SmartCity Malta complex.

The stage design was presented during the Heads of Delegations meeting held on 30 September 2014. Gio'Forma, a Milan-based design company, was given the task of designing the stage for the 2014 contest. The stage used an origami-like appearance, inspired by the triangle-shaped 2014 Junior Eurovision logo.

Host
On 10 September 2014, it was announced that Moira Delia would host the 2014 contest. She is known in Malta for presenting editions of Malta Eurovision Song Contest, Malta's national selection for the Eurovision Song Contest. She was the first presenter to host the contest single-handedly.

Running order
During the Heads of Delegations meeting in Malta on 30 September 2014, the broadcaster PBS along with the production team sought permission to change the running order rule, which was to allow the artists to randomly select their position number (a system used in 2013).  The agreed change was for the host country, Malta, to pick their position at random, followed by countries that were to open and close the show to be picked randomly.  The remaining countries would then select at random whether they were to perform in the first or second half of the show.  This draw took place during the opening ceremony, at the Verdala Palace on 9 November 2013.  A pre-draw to decide the order in which countries would select their running order halves, took place on 7 November 2014, hosted by Moira Delia, Vladislav Yakovlev, and Gaia Cauchi.  PBS and the production team then decided the running order so that they could avoid similar entries performing consecutively.  This method has been used in the senior contests since .  The Executive Supervisor along with the Steering Group presented the finalised running order shortly after the opening ceremony.

Rehearsals
The national broadcaster, PBS, decided at the Heads of Delegations meeting on 30 September 2014, that all participating countries would not have their rehearsals in running order; allowing for school visits and personal trips of the participants to be carried out uninterruptedly, something which had not been done in previous years.

Voting
The voting system for 2014 was reverted to a system previously used in both the Junior and Senior contests prior to 2013.  Both the national juries and televoting awarded 1 to 8 points, 10 and then the maximum 12 points to their ten favourite songs.  The way the votes were to be announced remained unchanged, the first seven points appeared on screen; whilst spokespersons from each of the participating countries read out their top three points (8, 10, and 12).

On 30 October 2014, the EBU announced that a new online voting system would be introduced for the 2014 contest, to allow countries from around the world to vote for their favourite entry.  The votes were not used in the official voting results, but the country who received the most online votes was presented with the new "Online Voting Winner" award, during the winners presentation conference after the show.  In order to prevent vote-rigging, the online results were published via the Junior Eurovision website, after the show has concluded. Due to the website crashing the online voting award was not awarded.

Participating countries
On 30 September 2014, it was confirmed that sixteen countries would be taking part in the contest. This was the highest number of entries since .

Participants and results

Detailed voting results 

Vincenzo Cantiello who represented Italy with the song "Tu primo grande amore", was declared the winner after all the votes had been cast from all of the sixteen participating countries and the kids jury. Below is a full breakdown of how the votes were cast.

12 points 
Below is a summary of all 12 points received. All countries were given 12 points at the start of voting to ensure that no country finished with nul points.

Spokespersons 

The order in which each country announces their votes was in the order of performance. Details of the running order were published by the EBU after the 'Welcome Reception' on 9 November 2014.  The spokespersons are shown below alongside each participating country. Gaia Cauchi announced the points from the 'Kids Jury.'

 Gaia Cauchi
 Katerina Taperkina
 Ina Angelova
 Clara
 Sarah
 Paris Nicolaou
 Mariam Khunjgurua
 Elias Elffors Elfström
 Sofia Tarasova
 Gal Fajon
 Aleksandra
 Geordie Schembri
 Monica Avanesyan
 Maria Kareeva
 Tamara Vasović
 Julian Pulis
 Mylène and Rosanne

Other countries

For a country to be eligible for potential participation in the Junior Eurovision Song Contest, it needs to be an active member of the European Broadcasting Union.  It is unknown whether the EBU issue invitations of participation to all 56 active members like they do for the Eurovision Song Contest.  Sixteen countries confirmed their participation in the 2014 contest.  The following EBU active members announced their decisions as shown below.

Active EBU Members
On 30 September 2014, it was revealed by the official list of participating countries that Azerbaijan were not participating at the contest in Malta.
The German broadcaster Norddeutscher Rundfunk (NDR) announced they would not début at the 2014 contest as they believed the contest would not be a success under the German television marketing standards. They did, however, observe the 2014 contest.
It was previously reported by Esc+Plus that Greece were going to participate in the 2014 contest. However, on 7 July 2014, the Greek broadcaster New Hellenic Radio, Internet and Television (NERIT) confirmed to the same web site that they would not be participating.
Despite being heavily rumoured to be planning a début for the 2014 contest, on 9 July 2014, the Hungarian broadcaster MTVA announced they would not be taking part in the contest.
One of the Irish broadcasters, Raidió Teilifís Éireann (RTÉ), announced in December 2013 that they do not have any interest in participating in the Junior Eurovision Song Contest, despite attending a steering group meeting. Another Irish broadcaster, TG4, had shown interested in the contest but would require funding from the Broadcasting Authority of Ireland (BAI). However, the BAI rejected such funding requests from TG4 in May 2014, so the network stated that they would not be making their début in Malta. However, they would be working harder to ascertain such funding with high hopes to participate in the 2015 contest. TG4 managed to debut at the contest in 2015 for Ireland.
On 30 September 2014, it was revealed by the official list of participating countries that Moldova were not participating at the contest in Malta.
Despite initially confirming their participation in the contest on 28 July 2014, the Portuguese broadcaster, Rádio e Televisão de Portugal (RTP), announced on 4 September 2014 that Portugal would not return to the contest in 2014.
Bianca Dinescu, a representative of the Romanian broadcaster Romanian Television (TVR), had stated in an interview that Romania were considering a return to the contest, after being absent since 2009. However, on 2 August 2014, it was confirmed that Romania were not returning in 2014, but TVR said that they have high hopes to return in 2015.
During the Eurovision Song Contest 2014 in Copenhagen, the head of the Spanish delegation, Federico Llano said that Televisión Española (TVE) was not planning to participate in the 2014 contest. If Spain were to return in the future, open castings and auditions would be held across the country.

Non-active EBU Members
In August 2014, executive supervisor Yakolev said that he was investigating the possibility of allowing commercial networks, who are not members of the EBU, to field contestants.
According to the Junior Eurovision official Twitter account, the European Broadcasting Union were negotiating with Spanish private TV channels to manage the return of Spain to the contest. On 28 September 2014, it was announced that a decision about allowing private TV channels to take part hasn't been taken in time for this edition.

Broadcasts 

Most countries sent commentators to Malta, while others commentated from their own country, in order to add insight to the participants and, where necessary, provision of voting information.

The following non-participating countries also sent commentators to Malta for radio and television broadcasts of the contest.

Other awards

Press vote
At the press center during the contest, members of the press were allowed to vote for their favourite acts. Below is the top five overall results, after all the votes had been cast.

Official album

Junior Eurovision Song Contest Malta 2014, is a compilation album put together by the European Broadcasting Union, and was released by Universal Music Group on 3 November 2014. The album features all the songs from the 2014 contest, along with karaoke versions.

Notes and references

Notes

References

External links

 
2014 song contests
2014 in radio
2014 television specials
2014
2014 in Malta
Marsa, Malta
Entertainment events in Malta
November 2014 events in Europe